Shohei Kiyohara (清原 翔平, born June 25, 1987) is a Japanese football player SC Sagamihara.

Club statistics
Updated to end of 2018 season.

References

External links
Profile at Zweigen Kanazawa

Profile at Cerezo Osaka

1987 births
Living people
Sapporo University alumni
Association football people from Hokkaido
Japanese footballers
J1 League players
J2 League players
J3 League players
Japan Football League players
Sagawa Shiga FC players
Zweigen Kanazawa players
Cerezo Osaka players
Cerezo Osaka U-23 players
Tokushima Vortis players
SC Sagamihara players
Association football midfielders
People from Obihiro, Hokkaido